= Ajiwa Dam =

Coordinates: 12.937°N 7.755°E

- Interactive map of Ajiwa Dam
- Country: Nigeria
- Location: Katsina State
- Purpose: Water supply, irrigation, flood control
- Status: Operational

Dam and spillways
- Impounds: Karaduwa River

Ajiwa Dam is a water supply reservoir located in Ajiwa, in northwestern Nigeria. It is one of the key water infrastructure facilities supplying water to Katsina metropolis and surrounding communities.

== Location ==
The dam is situated in Katsina State, Nigeria, and is constructed on the Karaduwa River system. It forms part of the state’s water supply network supporting urban and rural water needs.

== Purpose ==
Ajiwa Dam was constructed primarily for:

Municipal water supply, Irrigation for agriculture, Flood control and regulation, Supporting fisheries and local livelihoods, Water Supply Role

The dam is a major source of potable water for Katsina metropolis. It feeds water treatment and distribution systems that supply households, businesses, and public infrastructure.

== Environmental studies ==
Scientific research has been conducted on Ajiwa Reservoir to assess its water quality and ecological condition. These studies show that the reservoir is influenced by seasonal changes, agricultural runoff, and human activities in surrounding communities.

A study assessing physicochemical parameters of Ajiwa Reservoir highlighted variations in water quality indicators important for environmental monitoring and public health management.

Another study on plankton composition in Ajiwa Reservoir emphasized its ecological importance and sensitivity to environmental pressure.

== Rehabilitation and development ==
The dam has been part of government efforts to improve water supply infrastructure in Katsina State. Rehabilitation projects have focused on improving water treatment capacity and distribution systems linked to the reservoir.

These efforts aim to enhance reliable water access for the growing population of Katsina metropolis.

== Importance ==
Ajiwa Dam remains a critical infrastructure asset in Katsina State. It supports domestic water supply, agriculture, and local economic activities, making it an essential part of regional development.
